Gadol or godol (plural: gedolim ) (literally "big" or "great" in Hebrew ) is used by religious Jews to refer to the most revered rabbis of the generation.

Usage
The term gadol hador refers to the "great/est (one of) the generation" denoting one rabbi who is presumed to be even greater than the others. Other variations of the term are Gadol Yisrael or a Gadol BeYisrael (plural: Gedolei Yisrael), meaning "great one of the Jewish people".

A similar title is Rashkebahag, which is an acronym for "Rabbon shel kol bnei hagolah" (The sage and teacher of the entire Jewish diaspora). Another term is Manhig Yisroel (plural: Manhigei Yisroel), literally "leader of Israel".

The title gadol hador is usually only given to one Jewish Sage at a time, while the title "Rashkebahag" can be given to a few, and the term Gedolei Yisrael collectively refers to all leading rabbis in the Haredi community.

The term is generally applied to rabbinic leaders since World War I. Major rabbis from earlier generations are known as Rishonim or Achronim.

Role
Often, a gadol functions as a rosh yeshiva (the head of a yeshiva Talmudical school), and/or can be a Hasidic Rebbe. A gadol is quite often also a posek (a decisor of Halakha - Jewish law) and may be the author of rabbinic literature and responsa.

Adherents of Haredi Judaism often presume that a gadol has some degree of ruach hakodesh ("divine spirit"); the gadol'''s teachings and statements therefore become the crux of Daas Torah.

According to Rabbi Nota Greenblatt, posek and rosh yeshiva of Yeshiva of Memphis, a true gadol is far more than a great Talmid Chakham; he is someone that has wisdom, concern for others, and has fully developed his middos.

Rabbi Chaim Epstein has been quoted as saying:

Related concepts
In Hebrew halachic texts, gadol is also used as a term for a Jewish boy who turns thirteen, and is viewed as an adult regarding to his obligation to practice the 613 commandments. This is the age of Bar Mitzvah. When a Jewish girl reaches the age of twelve, according to Jewish law, she is called a gedolah (the feminine form of gadol).Kohen Gadol refers to the high priests in the Jewish Temples. Shabbat Hagadol is the Shabbat prior to Passover.

In modern Hebrew, gadol as slang is used as an interjection to mean something is extremely cool, out of this world, superb, awesome, absurdly funny or hilarious. For example, upon hearing a funny joke one might interject "Gadol!"In English writing, the transliterated word "gadol" generally refers to a prominent rabbi.

 Recognized gedolei hador 

The following are names of rabbis of the non-Hasidic communities that were or are widely recognized to be the gadol hador'':

 Vilna Gaon
 Rabbi Akiva Eger
 Rabbi Yisrael Meir Kagan
 Rabbi Moshe Feinstein
 Rabbi Elazar Shach
 Rabbi Yosef Shalom Elyashiv
 Rabbi Ovadia Yosef
 Rabbi Aharon Leib Shteinman
 Rabbi Chaim Kanievsky

See also
Gedolim pictures

References

External links
 Biographies of Gedolim: Alphabetical Index

Orthodox rabbinic roles and titles